In mathematics, the Alperin–Brauer–Gorenstein theorem characterizes the  finite simple groups with quasidihedral or wreathed Sylow 2-subgroups. These are isomorphic either to three-dimensional projective special linear groups or projective special unitary groups over a finite field of odd order, depending on a certain congruence, or to the Mathieu group .   proved this in the course of 261 pages.

Notes

References

Theorems about finite groups